Robert Mossom, grandson of Robert Mossom, Bishop of Derry and Professor of Divinity at Trinity College, Dublin,  was Dean of Ossory from 1703 until 1747: he was also Vicar general of the diocese.

Notes

Alumni of Trinity College Dublin
Deans of Ossory